This article provides information on candidates who stood for the 1951 Australian federal election. The election was held on 28 April 1951.

By-elections, appointments and defections

Defections
In 1951, Country Party MP Charles Russell (Maranoa) was expelled from the party for advocating the appreciation of the pound. He contested the election as an independent.

Retiring Members and Senators

Labor
 Jack Holloway MP (Melbourne Ports, Vic)
Senator Fred Beerworth (SA)

Liberal
 Dame Enid Lyons MP (Darwin, Tas)
 Percy Spender MP (Warringah, NSW)
Senator Wilfrid Simmonds (Qld)

House of Representatives
Sitting members at the time of the election are shown in bold text. Successful candidates are highlighted in the relevant colour. Where there is possible confusion, an asterisk (*) is also used.

Australian Capital Territory

New South Wales

Northern Territory

Queensland

South Australia

Tasmania

Victoria

Western Australia

Senate
Sitting Senators are shown in bold text. Since this was a double dissolution, all senators were up for re-election, with the first five from each state elected to six-year terms and the remaining five to three-year terms. Tickets that elected at least one Senator are highlighted in the relevant colour. Successful candidates are identified by an asterisk (*).

New South Wales
Ten seats were up for election. The Labor Party was defending six seats. The Liberal-Country Coalition was defending four seats.

Queensland
Ten seats were up for election. The Labor Party was defending three seats. The Liberal-Country Coalition was defending seven seats.

South Australia
Ten seats were up for election. The Labor Party was defending seven seats. The Liberal Party was defending three seats.

Tasmania
Ten seats were up for election. The Labor Party was defending six seats. The Liberal Party was defending four seats.

Victoria
Ten seats were up for election. The Labor Party was defending six seats. The Liberal-Country Coalition was defending four seats.

Western Australia
Ten seats were up for election. The Labor Party was defending six seats. The Liberal-Country Coalition was defending four seats.

Summary by party 

Beside each party is the number of seats contested by that party in the House of Representatives for each state, as well as an indication of whether the party contested Senate elections in each state.

See also
 1951 Australian federal election
 Members of the Australian House of Representatives, 1949–1951
 Members of the Australian House of Representatives, 1951–1954
 Members of the Australian Senate, 1950–1951
 Members of the Australian Senate, 1951–1953
 List of political parties in Australia

References
Adam Carr's Election Archive - House of Representatives 1951
Adam Carr's Election Archive - Senate 1951

1951 in Australia
Candidates for Australian federal elections